The 1968–69 South-West Indian Ocean cyclone season was a below average cyclone season.

Systems

Severe Tropical Storm Annie

Annie existed from October 28 to November 4.

Moderate Tropical Storm Bettina–Berthe

Berth existed from December 27 to January 4.

Moderate Tropical Storm Claire

Claire existed from January 15 to January 17.

Tropical Cyclone Dany

Tropical Cyclone Dany caused 80 deaths in Madagascar, and 2 in Réunion.

Tropical Depression Eve

Eve existed from January 29 to February 2.

Tropical Cyclone Enid–Fanny

Fanny existed from February 5 to February 15.

Tropical Cyclone Gilette

Gilette existed from February 15 to February 19.

Tropical Cyclone Helene

Helene existed from March 19 to March 28.

See also

 Atlantic hurricane seasons: 1968, 1969
 Eastern Pacific hurricane seasons: 1968, 1969
 Western Pacific typhoon seasons: 1968, 1969
 North Indian Ocean cyclone seasons: 1968, 1969

References

South-West Indian Ocean cyclone seasons